Maria Grazia Orsani (born 11 June 1969) is an Italian retired racewalker, which participated at the 1987 World Championships in Athletics.

Achievements

See also
 Italian team at the running events
 Italy at the IAAF World Race Walking Cup

References

External links
 

1969 births
Living people
Italian female racewalkers
World Athletics Championships athletes for Italy